3260 or variation, may refer to:

In general
 A.D. 3260, a year in the 4th millennium CE
 3260 BC, a year in the 4th millennium BCE
 3260, a number in the 3000 (number) range

Other uses
 3260 Vizbor, an asteroid in the Asteroid Belt, the 3260th asteroid registered
 Louisiana Highway 3260, a state highway
 Texas Ranch to Market Road 3260, a state highway

See also